Steve or Steven Wilson may refer to:

Music
 Steve Wilson (jazz musician) (born 1961), American jazz saxophonist and flautist
 Steve Wilson (drummer), former drummer for Against All Will
 Steve Wilson (born 1967), Scottish guitarist, member of the Scottish rock band Stiltskin
 Steven Wilson (born 1967), English progressive rock musician
 Steve Wilson (producer), Nashville based songwriter, musician and producer of More Beautiful You

Politics
 Steve Wilson (Ohio politician), Ohio state senator
 Steven Wilson, candidate in the United States House of Representatives elections in Missouri, 2010

Sports
 Stephen Wilson (athlete) (born 1971), an Australian Paralympic athlete
 Steve Wilson (offensive lineman) (born 1954), American NFL player for the Tampa Bay Buccaneers
 Steve Wilson (defensive back) (born 1957), American NFL player for the Denver Broncos
 Steve Wilson (baseball) (born 1964), Canadian baseball player
 Steven Wilson (baseball, born 1994), American baseball player
 Steve Wilson (football commentator) (born 1967), British Match of the Day commentator
 Steve Wilson (footballer) (born 1974), English goalkeeper

Other
 Steve Wilson (director), American television director
 Steve Wilson (presenter) (born 1974), English television presenter
 Steve Wilson (reporter), American investigative reporter
 Steve Wilson, character in Angels with Broken Wings
 S. S. Wilson (Steven Seth Wilson), American screenwriter
 Steven E. Wilson, American professor of ophthalmology
 Steve Wilson, Radio Presenter

See also
Stephen Clarke-Willson, video game and software expert
Stephen Wilson (disambiguation)